Jason Barrett is a Republican member of the West Virginia Senate, representing the 16th district. Barrett is also a small business owner.

After serving one term in the state House of Delegates, Barrett was defeated by Republican challenger Walter Duke in 2014.

In the 2016 election, in which Duke did not seek re-election, Barrett defeated Republican challenger Travis Bishop to regain his seat in the House.

References

External links

Legislative page

1982 births
Living people
West Virginia Democrats
West Virginia Republicans
West Virginia state senators
Members of the West Virginia House of Delegates
Politicians from Martinsburg, West Virginia
21st-century American politicians